Governor Beshear may refer to:

 Andy Beshear (born 1977), 63rd Governor of Kentucky
 Steve Beshear (born 1944), 61st Governor of Kentucky